Lesley Letcher (née McKechnie) (born 25 August 1965) is a former association football player who represented New Zealand at international level.

Letcher made her Football Ferns début in a 1–0 win over Taiwan on 28 March 1989, and finished her international career with five caps and one goal to her credit.

References

1965 births
Living people
New Zealand women's international footballers
New Zealand women's association footballers
Women's association football forwards